The Force Protection Ocelot is a British armoured vehicle that replaced the United Kingdom's Snatch Land Rover with British forces. It received the service name Foxhound, in line with the canine names given to other wheeled armored vehicles in current British use such as Mastiff, Wolfhound, and Ridgeback, which are all variants of the Cougar.

It is not to be confused with the BAE Systems Australia Foxhound, a modified Short Brothers S600.

The goal in replacing the Snatch Land Rover was to improve protection of personnel against improvised explosive devices (IEDs).

Design 
Designed by Force Protection Europe and the automotive engineering company Ricardo, the Ocelot is intended for use as a light protected patrol vehicle (LPPV) with specialised protection against roadside bombs and improvised explosive devices (IEDs). It can weigh up to  when loaded. This is smaller than most Mine-Resistant Ambush-Protected (MRAP) vehicles, but larger than the Humvee replacement vehicles being developed through the Joint Light Tactical Vehicle (JLTV) program.

Its wheels function independently, so the vehicle's other wheels should continue to work if one is blown off. It is claimed that the engine can be removed and replaced in 30 minutes.

The design is modular, and all of the components can be removed easily. The protective pod where up to six people can sit is interchangeable to allow easy modification according to the vehicle's role. For example, it can perform as an ambulance, supply vehicle, or jeep. Parts can also be easily replaced for minimum service time. It can travel through terrain that would not be accessible to other civilian vehicles, such as jungle, deep mud, or ruts. Its cabin is made of advanced composite materials. It is claimed that such composite materials can provide protection like metal armor with a composite spall liner, but at a lighter weight, saving fuel. Critical parts such as the crew compartment, engine, fuel tank and transmission are contained within the V-shaped armored 'spine' that deflects potential blast away from the pod, thus protecting the occupants and key components.

The Ocelot will be the first British military vehicle to meet the MoD's recent Generic Vehicle Architecture (GVA) requirements. The GVA requirements are intended to create a single, standard digital electronic and electrical architecture for UK vehicles.

History 

Force Protection Industries in America and Europe has developed several mine-resistant vehicles with V-shaped hulls since 2000, including the Buffalo and the Cougar (specific variants of which were bought by the British military as the Mastiff, Ridgeback, and Wolfhound, and by the Iraqi military as the Badger). These have demonstrated improved protection of soldiers exposed to blast threats.  Both the Buffalo and the Cougar are large and heavy.  Force Protection developed the Ocelot to meet the need for a smaller, lighter, more versatile vehicle that could still provide protection against blasts.

The Ocelot was first shown in September 2009 by Force Protection Europe at the Defence Systems and Equipment International exhibition in London. Two units were purchased by the British Ministry of Defence (MoD) in April 2010 for further testing.

On 22 September 2010, the MoD announced that the Ocelot would replace the Snatch Land Rover, the previous LPPV, which has received criticism for its lack of protection against roadside bombs. The MoD has renamed the vehicle Foxhound in line with the "dog" names given to other wheeled armoured vehicles in British use, such as Mastiff and Ridgeback. The original order was for 300 vehicles at a cost of £270m, with another 25 ordered in 2012 at a cost of £30m.

On 17 June 2012, it was announced by the MoD that the Foxhound had been delivered to Afghanistan and was undergoing final tests and evaluation before being deployed on operations.

On 18 January 2015, Defense News reported that General Dynamics was offering Ocelot to Canada as a replacement for its special forces Humvees.

See also

Supacat Protected Vehicle 400 series (SPV400)
Bushmaster Protected Mobility Vehicle

References

External links

 Technical data sheet and pictures Foxhound LPPV
Foxhound LPPV
General Dynamics Ocelot

Armoured cars of the United Kingdom
Cars of England
Military vehicles introduced in the 2000s
Armoured personnel carriers of the United Kingdom
Wheeled armoured personnel carriers